Premasathi Vattel Te is a Marathi movie released in May 1987. Produced by Uma Prakash Bhende and directed by Dutta Keshav.

Cast 

The cast includes Uma Bhende, Prakash Bhende, Ashok Saraf, Laxmikant Berde, Kanchan Adhikari, Padma Chavan, Sudhir Joshi, Sukanya Kulkarni, Atmaram Bhende, Manorama Wagle.

Soundtrack
The music is provided by Shrikant Telang.

References

External links 
 
 Movie Details - gomolo.com
 Premasathi Vattel Te - firstpost.com

1987 films
1980s Marathi-language films